In vexillology, a state flag is either the flag of the government of a sovereign state, or the flag of an individual federated state (subnational administrative division).

Government flag
A state flag is a variant of a national flag (or occasionally a completely different design) specifically designated and restricted by law or custom (theoretically or actually) to use by a country's government or its agencies. For this reason, they are sometimes referred to as government flags. In many countries the state flag and the civil flag (as flown by the general public) are identical, but in other countries, notably those in Latin America, central Europe, and Scandinavia, the state flag is a more complex version of the national flag, often featuring the national coat of arms or some other emblem as part of the design. Scandinavian countries also use swallowtailed state flags, to further differentiate them from civil flags.

In addition, some countries have state ensigns, separate flags for use by non-military government ships such as guard vessels.  For example, government ships in the United Kingdom fly the Blue Ensign.

State flags should not be confused with the national flag as used by military organizations; these are referred to as war flags and naval ensigns.

National flags with separate state and civil versions

Flag of a federated state (subnational entity) 

In Australia, Brazil, the United States, and some other federalized countries, the term state flag can have a different usage, as it frequently refers to an official flag of any of the individual states or territorial subdivisions that make up the nation.

To avoid confusion with the first meaning of the term, however, such a flag would be more precisely referred to as "the flag of the state of X", rather than "the state flag of X". For this usage, see also:

 Flags of the Australian states
 Flags of the Austrian states
 Flags of the Brazilian states
 Flags of the German states
 Flags of the Malaysian states
 Flags of the Mexican states
 Flags of Pakistani provinces and territories
 Flags of the U.S. states and territories

Notes

References

External links
 

Types of flags

fi:Suomen lippu#Valtiolippu